Carlo Casap (born 29 December 1998) is a Romanian footballer who plays as a midfielder for Liga I club Farul Constanța.

Career statistics

Club

Honours

Club
Viitorul Constanța
Liga I: 2016–17
Cupa României: 2018–19
Supercupa României: 2019

References

External links

1998 births
Living people
Sportspeople from Timișoara
Romanian footballers
Romania youth international footballers
Romania under-21 international footballers
Association football midfielders
Liga I players
FC Viitorul Constanța players
FCV Farul Constanța players
Liga II players
CS Concordia Chiajna players